The Sălaj is a left tributary of the river Someș in Romania. It discharges into the Someș in Sălsig.

Tributaries

The following rivers are tributaries to the river Sălaj:

Left: Mineu, Cioara, Cămin, Oarța, Băsești, Tămășești, Urmeniș, Asuaj
Right: Valea Râturilor

References

Rivers of Romania
Rivers of Sălaj County
Rivers of Maramureș County